Ryan Thompson may refer to:

Ryan Thompson (outfielder) (born 1967), American baseball player
Ryan Thompson (pitcher) (born 1992), American baseball player
Ryan Thompson (footballer) (born 1985), Jamaican footballer
Ryan Thompson (basketball) (born 1988), American basketball player

See also
Ryan Thomson (disambiguation)